The Couzinet 70 was a 1930s French three-engined commercial monoplane built by Société des Avions René Couzinet founded by René Couzinet.

Design and developments
The Couzinet 70 Arc-en-Ciel III ('Rainbow') was developed from the 1920s Couzinet 10 Arc-en-Ciel, which first flew on 7 May 1928, the Couzinet 11 and Couzinet 40.  The slightly larger span Couzinet 70 was developed originally as a mail plane for use of Aéropostale's South Atlantic service. It was a low-wing monoplane with a fixed tailwheel landing gear. The aircraft was powered by three Hispano-Suiza 12Nb inline piston engines. The two wing mounted engines could be accessed in flight through tunnels in the wing. After route-proving in 1933 the aircraft was modified and re-designated the Couzinet 71 and entered service with Aéropostale in May 1934.

Variants
10 Arc en Ciel
The original prototype four place long range aircraft, later converted to the Couzinet 11
11 Arc en Ciel II
Converted from the Couzinet 10 but crashing on 8 August 1928
70  Arc en Ciel III
Three-engined Hispano-Suiza 12Nb powered prototype, one built and converted to a Couzinet 71
71
Prototype modified for service as a mailplane, with lengthened nose and strut-braced tailplane.

Operators

Aéropostale

Spanish Republican Air Force - Couzinet 101

Specifications (70/71)

References

External links

1930s French mailplanes
Trimotors
Low-wing aircraft
70
Aircraft first flown in 1932